Nykhaz is a political party in South Ossetia founded in 2013 by supporters of Independent president Leonid Tibilov.

History

The party was founded by Alan Alborov in order to participate in the 2014 South Ossetian parliamentary election in which they won four seats with Ruslan Gagloyev acting as the party's parliamentary leader. Although officially an Independent, the party has been associated with then President Leonid Tibilov, with this association continuing even after him leaving office in 2017.

During his unsuccessful campaign for president in 2017, Nykhaz endorsed Tibilov who ran as an Independent. In the lead up to the 2019 South Ossetian parliamentary election the New Ossetia party led by David Sanakoyev and the Alanian Union led by Alan Gagloev merged into Nykhaz, with Sanakoyev becoming the new party leader. This resutled in the party almost doubling their vote from 7.79% to 14.37%, however, they failed to garner any more seats in Parliament. Gagloev would go on to be elected the Chairman of the party in February of 2020.

Gagloev would be the party's candidate for president in the 2022 presidential election and would defeat the incumbent President Anatoly Bibilov to become the fifth President of South Ossetia. Following his election Zita Besayeva was elected leader of the party in February 2023.

Election results

Parliament of South Ossetia

Presidential

Party Chairmen

References

Political parties established in 2013
Political parties in South Ossetia